Larry Campbell Ward (born October 14, 1947) was a Canadian politician who served in the Legislative Assembly of Saskatchewan from 1995 to 1999, as a NDP member for the constituency of Estevan.

References

1947 births
Living people
Politicians from Regina, Saskatchewan
Saskatchewan New Democratic Party MLAs